Khadda is a constituency of the Uttar Pradesh Legislative Assembly covering the city of Khadda in the Kushinagar district of Uttar Pradesh, India.

Khadda is one of five assembly constituencies in the Kushi Nagar Lok Sabha constituency. Since 2008, this assembly constituency is numbered 329 amongst 403 constituencies.

Members of assembly
 When the seat was named Naurangia.
 1974 : Shri Narain, urf Bhulai Bhai (Jana Sangh) 
 1977 : Shri Narain, urf Bhulai Bhai (Jana Sangh) 
 1980 : Mahesh Prasad (Congress(I)),seat reserved for SC candidates 
 In 2008, the seat was renamed Khadda after delimitation of constituencies.
 2017 : Jatashankar Tripathi (BJP)
 2022 : Vivekanand Pandey (Nishad Party)

Election results

2022

2017

This seat belonged to Bharatiya Janta Party candidate Jatashanker Tripathi who won in last Assembly election of 2017 Uttar Pradesh Legislative Elections defeating Bahujan Samaj Party candidate Vijay Pratap Kushwaha by a margin of 38,497 votes.
 Jatashankar Tripathi (BJP)
 Vijay Prasad Kushwaha (BSP)

1980 Vidhan Sabha Elections 
 Mahesh Prasad (INC(I)) : 22,114
 Nathuni (JNP-SC) :  10,180

1977 Vidhan Sabha Elections 
 Shri Narain urf Bhulai Bhai (Janata Party) : 30,956
 Baijnath Prasad (Congress) :  22,279

1974 Vidhan Sabha Elections 

Bhulai Bhai - of Jana Sangh, Janata Party, and BJP over years - represented Khadda area (then known as Naurangia seat) in 1974 and 1977.
 The seat was named Naurangiya in 1974.
 Shri Narain urf Bhulai Bhai (Jana Sangh) : 21,422
 Baijnath Prasad (Congress) :  19,508

References

External links
 

Assembly constituencies of Uttar Pradesh
Kushinagar district